The Thayer Lake North Shelter Cabin is a historic backcountry shelter in the Admiralty Island National Monument, part of the Tongass National Forest in Southeast Alaska.  It was one of a number of such facilities built by Civilian Conservation Corps (CCC) on the Admiralty Island Canoe Route between 1933 and 1937.  This cabin, a three-sided Adirondack-style log structure with shake walls and roof, was built in 1935, and located at the northern tip of Thayer Lake, near a trailhead and a small log bridge.

The cabin was listed on the National Register of Historic Places in 1995.

See also
National Register of Historic Places listings in Hoonah-Angoon Census Area, Alaska

References

External links
Tongass National Forest page on the cabin

Park buildings and structures on the National Register of Historic Places in Alaska
Buildings and structures completed in 1936
Log cabins in the United States
Tongass National Forest
Civilian Conservation Corps in Alaska
Buildings and structures on the National Register of Historic Places in Hoonah–Angoon Census Area, Alaska
Log buildings and structures on the National Register of Historic Places in Alaska